Bourbon Township is one of nine townships in Douglas County, Illinois, USA.  As of the 2010 census, its population was 4,124 and it contained 1,352 housing units.

Geography

Cities, towns, villages
 Arthur (eastern portion)

Unincorporated towns
 Bourbon at 
 Chesterville at

Extinct towns
 Fillmore at 
(These towns are listed as "historical" by the USGS.)

Cemeteries
The township contains these six cemeteries: Bourbon, Campbell, Fillmore, Miller, Yoder and Yoder.

Major highways
  Illinois Route 133

Demographics

School districts
 Arcola Consolidated Unit School District 306
 Arthur Community Unit School District 305

Political districts
 State House District 110
 State Senate District 55

References
 
 United States Census Bureau 2009 TIGER/Line Shapefiles
 United States National Atlas

External links
 City-Data.com
 Illinois State Archives
 Township Officials of Illinois

Townships in Douglas County, Illinois
Townships in Illinois